Low Bentham railway station served the village of Low Bentham, North Yorkshire, England, from 1850 to 1853 on the "Little" North Western Railway.

History 
The station was opened for public use on 1 June 1850 by the "Little" North Western Railway, although it opened earlier for market days only. It was a short-lived railway station, disappearing from the timetables in July 1853 but closed officially on 4 August 1853.  

The Leeds to Morecambe Line still passes through the site, though no trace of the station itself remains.

References

External links 

Disused railway stations in North Yorkshire
Railway stations in Great Britain closed in 1853
1850 establishments in England
1853 disestablishments in England

Railway stations in Great Britain opened in 1850